Anne-Marie Monnet is a French writer, the winner of the 1945 edition of the prix Femina.

Work 
 1945: Le Chemin du soleil, prix Femina, éditions du Myrte.
 1947: Les Possédés de Hurtebise, short stories, éditions du Myrte.
 1960: Katherine Mansfield followed by Journal d'Isabelle, éditions du Temps (series "Suite pour Isabelle")

References

External links 
 Le Chemin du soleil (1945) Amazon

20th-century French non-fiction writers
20th-century French women writers
Prix Femina winners